Jeremy Paul Aubrey George Janion   (born ) was a rugby union international  wing who represented England in twelve matches between 1971 and 1975.

Janion was educated at St. Edmund's College, Ware. He played for Saffron Walden, Bedford and London Counties before beginning his test career with an appearance for England U-25s against Fiji in 1970.  He later left Bedford for Richmond from where he won the last of his England caps.  He was a member of the Richmond team that won the Middlesex Sevens in 1974 and then played for Eastern Counties in the 1975 County Championship final.

References

1946 births
Living people
Bedford Blues players
England international rugby union players
English rugby union players
People educated at St Edmund's College, Ware
Richmond F.C. players
Rugby union players from Bishop's Stortford
Rugby union wings